John C. Ulrich is a United States Army brigadier general who most recently served as the Director of Capability and Resource Integration of the United States Cyber Command since June 19 to July 2021. Previously, he served as the Director of Force Development of the United States Army.

References

External links

Year of birth missing (living people)
Living people
Place of birth missing (living people)
United States Army generals